Roy William Neill (4 September 1887 – 14 December 1946) was an Irish-born American film director best known for directing the last eleven of the fourteen Sherlock Holmes films starring Basil Rathbone and Nigel Bruce, made between 1943 and 1946 and released by Universal Studios.

Biography

With his father as the captain, Roy William Neill was born on a ship off the coast of Ireland.  His birth name was Roland de Gostrie.  Neill began directing silent films in 1917 and went on to helm 111 films, 55 of them silent. Although most of Neill's films were low-budget B-movies, he was known for directing films with meticulously lit scenes with carefully layered shadows that would become the style of film noir in the late 1940s.  In fact, his last film, Black Angel (1946), is considered a film noir.

He was also credited in some works as R. William Neill, Roy W. Neill, and Roy Neill.  Neill lived in the United States for most of his career and was a US citizen.  He did go to London from 1935 until 1940 where better opportunities existed for American directors.  During this period, British film producer Edward Black hired Neill to direct The Lady Vanishes.  However, due to delays in production, Black hired Alfred Hitchcock to direct instead.

Neill died in London, England, from a heart attack.

Filmography

The Girl, Glory (1917)
The Mother Instinct (1917)
They're Off (1917)
The Price Mark (1917)
Love Letters (1917)
Flare-Up Sal (1918)
Love Me (1918)
Free and Equal (1918)
Tyrant Fear (1918)
The Mating of Marcella (1918)
The Kaiser's Shadow (1918)
Green Eyes (1918)
Vive la France! (1918)
Puppy Love (1919)
Charge It to Me (1919)
Trixie from Broadway (1919)
The Career of Katherine Bush (1919)
The Bandbox (1919)
The Woman Gives (1920)
The Inner Voice (1920)
Yes or No? (1920)
Good References (1920)
Dangerous Business (1920)
Something Different (1920)
The Idol of the North (1921)
The Conquest of Canaan (1921)
The Iron Trail (1921)
What's Wrong with the Women? (1922)
The Man From M.A.R.S. (1922)
Toilers of the Sea (1923)
By Divine Right (1924)
Vanity's Price (1924)
Broken Laws (1924)
Percy (1925)
Marriage in Transit (1925)
The Kiss Barrier (1925)
Greater Than a Crown (1925)
The Cowboy and the Countess (1926)
The Fighting Buckaroo (1926)
A Man Four-Square (1926)
Black Paradise (1926)
The City (1926)
Marriage (1927)
The Arizona Wildcat (1927)
The Lady of Victories (1928) - short
The Czarina's Secret (1928) - short
San Francisco Nights (1928)
The Virgin Queen (1928) - short
The Olympic Hero (1928)
Lady Raffles (1928)
Cleopatra (1928) - short
The Heart of General Robert E. Lee (1928) - short
The Viking (1928)
Madame DuBarry (1928) - short
Behind Closed Doors (1929)
Wall Street (1929)
The Melody Man (1930)
Cock 'o the Walk (1930) - lost film
Just Like Heaven (1930)
Fifty Fathoms Deep (1931)
The Avenger (1931)
The Good Bad Girl (1931)
Fifty Fathoms Deep (1931)
The Menace (1932)
American Madness (1932) - uncredited
That's My Boy (1932)
The Circus Queen Murder (1933)
As the Devil Commands (1933)
Fury of the Jungle (1933)
Above the Clouds (1933)
The Ninth Guest (1934)
Whirlpool (1934)
Black Moon (1934)
Blind Date (1934)
I'll Fix It (1934)
Jealousy (1934)
Mills of the Gods (1934)
Eight Bells (1935)
The Black Room (1935)
The Lone Wolf Returns (1935)
Gypsy (1937)
Doctor Syn (1937)
Quiet Please (1938)
The Viper (1938)
Simply Terrific (1938)
Double or Quits (1938)
Thank Evans (1938) British
Many Tanks Mr. Atkins (1938)
Everything Happens to Me (1938)
A Gentleman's Gentleman (1939)
Murder Will Out (1939)
His Brother's Keeper (1940)
Hoots Mon! (1940)
The Good Old Days (1939)
Eyes of the Underworld (1942)
Madame Spy (1942)
Sherlock Holmes and the Secret Weapon (1942)
Sherlock Holmes in Washington (1943)
Frankenstein Meets the Wolf Man (1943)
Rhythm of the Islands (1943)
Sherlock Holmes Faces Death (1943)
The Spider Woman (1943)
The Scarlet Claw (1944)
The Pearl of Death (1944)
Gypsy Wildcat (1944)
Sherlock Holmes and the House of Fear (1945)
The Woman in Green (1945)
Pursuit to Algiers (1945)
Terror by Night (1946)
Dressed to Kill (1946)
Black Angel (1946)

References

External links

 
 
 Passport portrait of Roy William Neil

1887 births
1946 deaths
People born at sea
Irish film directors
American film directors
Horror film directors
Irish emigrants to the United States (before 1923)